Vanuabalavu Airport or Vanua Balavu Airport  is an airport serving Vanua Balavu, the second largest of the Lau Islands in Fiji. It is operated by Airports Fiji Limited.

Airlines and destinations

References

External links
 

Airports in Fiji